Brides (transliterated Patardzlebi) is a 2014 Georgian-French film directed by Tinatin Kajrishvili. and produced by Gemini, Millimeter Films and ADASTRA Films.

In her feature film debut Tinatin Kajrishvili shows the daily routine of a woman whose partner is in prison. The film is about human dignity and the repressive judicial system in Georgia.

The film had its world premiere at the 64th Berlin International Film Festival in the Panorama section  and won the 3rd Place Panorama Audience Award – Fiction Film 2014. It has also been selected for the official competition (World Narrative Competition) of Tribeca Film Festival. Main actress Mari Kitia received the Special Jury Prize for Best Actress at the Sarajevo Film Festival, and the movie was given 3 awards at the Scarborough Worldwide Film Festival, including the Outstanding Directorial Achievement Award.

The film was supported by the Georgian National Film Center and the French National Center of Cinematography and the moving image.

Plot
Nutsa, a young mother, lives with her two children in a suburbs of Tbilisi in Georgia. Her partner Goga is in prison. They get married, so she gains the right to talk to him once a month in the visiting room on the other side of the glass. The ceremony is quick with a strange ambiance. Goga in prison, Nutsa with children outside, a routine sets in.

Cast
 Mari Kitia
 Giorgi Maskharashvili
 Giorgi Makharadze
 Darejan Khachidze
 Tamar Mamulashvili
 Anuka Grigolia.      
 nita kalichava

Festivals

Awards :

 64th Berlin International Film Festival - Panorama Section 
Third audience award
Special Jury Prize

 Sarajevo Film Festival (Bosnia and Herzegovina) 
Special Jury Prize 
Heart of Sarajevo for Best Actress for Mari Kitia

 Batumi Summer Theater Film Festival (Georgia)
Special Jury Prize
 Scarborough Worldwide Film Festival (Canada)
Audience Choice Award 
Outstanding Directorial Achievement 
Outstanding Achievement in Cinematography

Selections :

 64th Berlin International Film Festival - Panorama Section (Germany) - 2014
 Tribeca Film Festival (United States)- 2014
 Mooov International Film Festival (Belgium) - 2014
 Off Plus Camera (Poland) - 2014
 Busan International Film Festival (South Korea) - 2014
 Five Lakes Film Festival (Germany) - 2014
 Milano Film Festival (Italy) - 2014
 BFI London Film Festival (United Kingdom) - 2014
 Sarajevo Film Festival (Bosnia and Herzegovina) - 2014
 Festival do Rio (Brazil) - 2014
 Stockholm International Film Festival (Sweden) - 2014
 Cabourg Film Festival (France)- 2015
 Romania International Film Festival (Romania)- 2015
 Vox Feminae Film Festival (Croatia) - 2015
 Women in Film, Los Angeles (United States) - 2016
 Vancouver International Film Festival (Canada) - 2016

References

External links
 

2014 films
Drama films from Georgia (country)
French drama films
2014 directorial debut films
2010s French films